Kasper Kristensen is the name of:

Kasper Kristensen (footballer, born 1986), Danish footballer
Kasper Kristensen (footballer, born 1999), Danish footballer

See also
Casper Christensen, Danish comedian